Susan E. Cornell (born July 26, 1971) is a former Republican member of the Pennsylvania House of Representatives.

She earned a degree in history from Temple University in 2000.

She was first elected to represent the 152nd legislative district in the Pennsylvania House of Representatives in a special election on March 9, 2004 to fill the remainder of her late father's term.

References

External links
Pennsylvania House of Representatives - Susan E. Cornell (Republican) official PA House profile (archived)

1971 births
Living people
People from Hatboro, Pennsylvania
Republican Party members of the Pennsylvania House of Representatives
Women state legislators in Pennsylvania
Pennsylvania lobbyists
Temple University alumni
21st-century American women